Sattenapalli revenue division is an administrative division in the Palnadu district of the Indian state of Andhra Pradesh. It is one of the three revenue divisions in the district and comprises 9 mandals. It was formed on 4 April 2022 along with the newly formed Palnadu district.

Administration 
The revenue division comprises 9 mandals: Atchampet, Amaravathi, Bellamkonda , Krosuru, Muppalla, Nekarikallu, Pedakurapadu, Rajupalem and Sattenapalle.

References 

2022 establishments in Andhra Pradesh